In mathematics, the unitarian trick  is a device in the representation theory of Lie groups, introduced by  for the special linear group and  by Hermann Weyl for general semisimple groups. It applies to show that the representation theory of some group G is in a qualitative way controlled by that of some other compact group K. An important example is that in which G is the complex general linear group, and K the unitary group acting on vectors of the same size. From the fact that the representations of K are completely reducible, the same is concluded for those of G, at least in finite dimensions.

The relationship between G and K that drives this connection is traditionally expressed in the terms that the Lie algebra of K is a real form of that of G. In the theory of algebraic groups, the relationship can also be put that K is a dense subset of G, for the Zariski topology.

The trick works for reductive Lie groups, of which an important case are semisimple Lie groups.

Weyl's theorem

The complete reducibility of finite-dimensional linear representations of compact groups, or connected semisimple Lie groups and complex semisimple Lie algebras goes sometimes under the name of Weyl's theorem. A related result, that the universal cover of a compact semisimple Lie group is also compact, also goes by the same name.

History
Adolf Hurwitz had shown how integration over a compact Lie group could be used to construct invariants, in the cases of unitary groups and compact orthogonal groups. Issai Schur in 1924 showed that this technique can be applied to show complete reducibility of representations for such groups via the construction of an invariant inner product. Weyl extended Schur's method to complex semisimple Lie algebras by showing they had a compact real form.

Notes

References
V. S. Varadarajan, An introduction to harmonic analysis on semisimple Lie groups (1999), p. 49.
Wulf Rossmann, Lie groups: an introduction through linear groups (2006), p. 225.
Roe Goodman, Nolan R. Wallach, Symmetry, Representations, and Invariants (2009), p. 171.

Representation theory of Lie groups